Fame in the Family is a British reality series that aired on Channel 4 over three weeks beginning 14 March 2022. It is narrated by Pippa Haywood. All episodes are currently available to stream on-demand on All 4.

Format
Four strangers meet up in Manchester Hall for dinner with a surprise celebrity host. At least one of the guests will be related to the host.

Over dinner they talk about their families and play fact-finding games to help them decide whether they could be related to one another.

At the end of the dinner party, the diners hold up a card on which they have written the name or names of who they think is a cousin of the celebrity. The host opens an envelope to reveal the DNA results. If anyone guesses correctly they win a share of a £1,000 cash prize.

The relevant parts of the family tree are then shown on-screen as the narrator explains how the guest or guests share a DNA match.

The show has been both praised and panned  by the press. There has been no announcement yet as to whether it will return for a second series.

Episodes

Series 1 (2022)

Similar programmes
The show borrows heavily from another Channel 4 daytime show Come Dine with Me mixed in with the long-running BBC series Who Do You Think You Are? and a touch of the ITV1 series Long Lost Family. According to the end credits, and in line with most genealogy programmes, the DNA results are provided by Ancestry with assistance from family history expert Brad Argent.

References

Reality television series